The culture of the Solomon Islands reflects the extent of the differentiation and diversity among the groups living within the Solomon Islands archipelago, which lies within Melanesia in the Pacific Ocean, with the peoples distinguished by island, language, topography, and geography.  The cultural area includes the nation state of Solomon Islands and the Bougainville Island, which is a part of Papua New Guinea.

The Solomon Islands includes some culturally Polynesian societies which lie outside the main region of Polynesian influence, known as the Polynesian Triangle. There are seven Polynesian outliers within the Solomon Islands: Anuta, Bellona, Ontong Java, Rennell, Sikaiana, Tikopia, and Vaeakau-Taumako.

Traditional culture

In the traditional culture of the Solomon Islands age-old customs are handed down from one generation to the next, allegedly from the ancestral spirits themselves, to form the cultural values of Solomon Islands.

Tepukei (ocean-going outrigger canoes)

Some Polynesian societies of eastern Solomon Islands built ocean-going outrigger canoes known as Tepukei. In 1966 Gerd Koch, a German anthropologist, carried out research at Graciosa Bay on Nendö Island (Ndende/Ndeni) in the Santa Cruz Islands and on Pileni and Fenualoa in the Reef Islands, and returned with documentary film, photographic and audio material. The films that Koch completed are now held by the German National Library of Science and Technology (TIB) in Hanover.

He brought back to the Ethnological Museum of Berlin the last still complete Tepukei from the Santa Cruz Islands.

Contemporary culture
In the contemporary Solomon Islands, as elsewhere in Melanesia, kastom is the core of the assertion of traditional values and cultural practices in a modern context. The Kastom Gaden Association, for example, advocates growing and eating traditional foods rather than imported ones.

Languages

Literature

Notable figures
Notable figures in contemporary Solomon Islands culture include painter Ake Lianga and musician Sharzy. Writers include John Saunana and Celo Kulagoe.

Cuisine

Sport

Many Solomon Islanders are passionate about sport, and it forms a major part of the country's culture in terms of spectating and participation.

Folklore

Solomon Islanders stories and legends have a cultural significance independent of their empirical truth or falsehood.

See also

 Music of Solomon Islands
 Solomon Islands dance
 Solomon Islands literature
 Languages of the Solomon Islands archipelago
 Religion in Solomon Islands

Notes

References
 
 .